Steven Simpson (born April 5, 2000) is a Canadian soccer player who plays as a forward for Danish club Esbjerg fB.

Club career
After spending time with Barnsley's Shadow Scholarship program, he signed a contract and joined their academy in October 2020. He signed a one-year contract extension with the club on July 3, 2021.

On July 11 Simpson was loaned to Danish 1st Division club Esbjerg fB on a half-season deal until December 31. However, only two months later, on September 8, 2021, the club confirmed that he had signed a permanent deal until June 2024 with Esbjerg.

International career
In February 2021, Simpson was named to Canada's 50-man preliminary squad for the re-scheduled 2020 CONCACAF Men's Olympic Qualifying Championship.

References

External links

2000 births
Living people
Canadian soccer players
Association football forwards
Danish 1st Division players
Boldmere St. Michaels F.C. players
Barnsley F.C. players
Esbjerg fB players
Canadian expatriate soccer players
Canadian expatriate sportspeople in Denmark
Expatriate men's footballers in Denmark